Linda Claire Steiner (born January 3, 1950) is a professor at Philip Merrill College of Journalism, University of Maryland. She is also the editor-in-chief of the journal Journalism & Communication Monographs, and sits on the editorial board of Critical Studies in Media Communication.

Biography
Steiner earned her degree from Smith College, and her Ph.D. (1979) from University of Illinois at Urbana–Champaign. Her 1979 doctoral thesis, The women's suffrage press, 1850-1900: a cultural analysis can be found here.

Steiner was previously professor and department chair at Rutgers University. She was also the president of the Association for Education in Journalism and Mass Communication 2011-2012.

Awards
 2012 Outstanding Woman of the Year in Journalism and Mass Communication Education.

Bibliography

Books

Chapters in books 
 
 
 
Also as: 
 
Also as:

Journal articles 
 
 
 
 
 
 
 
 
 
 
 
  Available at academia.edu.

See also
 Cynthia Carter

References

External links
 Profile page: Linda Steiner profile, Merrill.umd.edu; accessed October 29, 2016.

1950 births
American mass media scholars
Gender studies academics
Living people
Mass media theorists
Rutgers University faculty
Smith College alumni
University of Illinois Urbana-Champaign alumni
University of Maryland, College Park faculty
Place of birth missing (living people)